Cenk Gönen (born 21 February 1988) is a Turkish professional footballer who plays as a goalkeeper for Kayserispor.

Club career
After a season with Denizlispor in the  2006–07 season, he secured a first-team place as a goalkeeper. In the 2007–08 season, he was given the number 1 squad number. After an impressive season with Denizlispor, Cenk was transferred to Turkish giants Beşiktaş for €1 million, plus a player in exchange. He signed a five-year contract with the club, shortly after the arrival of Hakan Arıkan.

On 22 February 2014, during a game against Galatasaray which ended 1–0 for Galatasaray, Cenk fell unconscious after colliding with teammate Pedro Franco in an attempt to dive for the ball.

Personal life
Cenk is the nephew of Ali Artuner, who was also a goalkeeper for the Turkey national team.

Club statistics

Honours
Beşiktaş
Türkiye Kupası (1): 2010–11

Galatasaray SK
 Türkiye Kupası (1):  2015–16
 Süper Kupa (1): 2016

References

External links
 
 
 
 
 

Living people
1988 births
Footballers from İzmir
Association football goalkeepers
Turkish footballers
Turkey international footballers
Turkey under-21 international footballers
Turkey youth international footballers
Turkey B international footballers
Turkish expatriate sportspeople in Spain
Expatriate footballers in Spain
Altay S.K. footballers
Beşiktaş J.K. footballers
Denizlispor footballers
Galatasaray S.K. footballers
Göztepe S.K. footballers
Kayserispor footballers
Málaga CF players
Süper Lig players